Pölshals Pass, elevation , is a mountain pass in the Alps in the Austrian Bundesland of Styria. It connects Pöls with the valley of the Mur River.

The pass was already in use in Roman times.

See also
 List of highest paved roads in Europe
 List of mountain passes

Mountain passes of Styria
Mountain passes of the Alps